The Arakan Army is a Rakhine insurgent group based in Kayin State, Myanmar.

Objectives 
The Arakan Army's self-proclaimed objectives are as follows:
 To gain the right to self-determination for the ethnic groups of Rakhine State.
 To safeguard the national identity and cultural heritage of the Rakhine people.
 To promote the national dignity and interests of the Rakhine people.
 To liberate every citizen and ethnic group of Myanmar from the Burmese dictatorship.
 To ensure peace and development for all of humanity.

References 

Rebel groups in Myanmar
Paramilitary organisations based in Myanmar